Domenico Ricatti (born 16 May 1979) is an Italian male long-distance runner who won three times the national championships at senior level.

Achievements

National titles
 Italian Athletics Championships
 10,000 metres: 2011, 2014
 10 km road: 2012

References

External links
 

1979 births
Living people
Italian male long-distance runners
Italian male marathon runners
Athletics competitors of Centro Sportivo Aeronautica Militare